The consorts of the monarchs of Scotland, such as queens consort, princesses consort, and princes consort, bore titles derived from their marriage.  The Kingdom of Scotland was first unified as a state by Kenneth I of Scotland in 843, and ceased to exist as an independent kingdom after the Act of Union 1707 when it was merged with the Kingdom of England to become the Kingdom of Great Britain.

The early history of Scotland is confused and often obscure, due largely to information given by the sources of the time and after, which are often contradictory, vague, and lacking in detail. Details of the kings prior to Malcolm III are sparse, and the status of two – Giric and Eochaid – dubious; details of their wives are almost non-existent. Thus, it is practically impossible to construct a list of consorts of Scotland prior to the accession of Macbeth, whose wife Gruoch is well-documented and somewhat notorious.

House of Moray
Although a few details of earlier queens consort are known – for example, Duncan I was married to a woman named in one source as Suthen – the first queen about whom much is known is Gruoch, a daughter of Boite mac Cináeda, himself a son of either Kenneth II or Kenneth III. She was the wife of Macbeth and her son was Lulach. 
The mother of Máel Snechtai, Lulach's son, was still alive in 1078, when she was seized by Malcolm Canmore, but nothing else is known of her, not even if she and Lulach were married.

House of Dunkeld (1058–1286)
In 1058, Malcolm Long-neck of the House of Dunkeld overthrew his cousin, Lulach, and reclaimed the Scottish throne for himself. His family, the House of Dunkeld, would rule until the death of Alexander III in 1286, with whom the House ended. Alexander's heir was his infant granddaughter, Margaret, "the Maid of Norway", of the House of Fairhair; but she died, still unmarried and childless, in late 1290 before reaching Scotland, and was never crowned at Scone. After two years of Interregnum, the controversial John de Balliol was chosen as king (his wife was already dead, and never became queen consort); but after four years of reign, he abdicated, and Scotland entered another Interregnum until 1306.

House of Bruce (1306–1371) (Bruis)
In 1306, Robert the Bruce and his wife, Elizabeth de Burgh, were crowned King and Queen of Scots at Scone, ending the Scottish interregnum. The Bruce family would rule until the death of David II in 1371.

House of Stewart (1371–1707) (Gælic: Stiubhart)

Direct line (1371–1542)
Upon the death of David II in 1371, his nephew, Robert Stewart (the son of Walter Stewart and Marjorie Bruce, herself the daughter of Robert I by his first marriage) acceded to the throne. His direct line of heirs would continue to rule until the death of his last direct male descendant, James V. James left only a six-day-old girl as his heir, prompting his angry exclamation, "The devil go with it! [The rule of the Stewarts] will end as it began. It came with a lass, and it will pass with a lass." In this he was wrong: Mary would marry a member of a junior branch of the Stewart family, and the line they founded would rule not only Scotland but also England and Ireland until 1714. However, the final Stewart monarch was a woman, Anne, Queen of Great Britain.

House of Stuart (1542–1649)
In 1542, James V died, leaving his daughter Mary as Queen of Scots. Mary was later sent by her mother to the French court, where her surname was gallicised to Stuart. Mary married Henry Stuart, Lord Darnley, a member of a junior branch of the Stewart family (who had also gallicised their surname to Stuart). Their son, James VI, established the Stuart dynasty, which would rule not only Scotland but also England and Ireland. Their rule was briefly terminated with the Civil War, in which Charles I was executed and the Commonwealth declared; between 1649 and 1660, England, Scotland and Ireland were ruled by Parliament, dominated by Oliver Cromwell.

House of Stuart (restored) (1660–1707)
In 1660, Charles II, son of the executed Charles I, was restored to the thrones of England, Scotland and Ireland, and Stuart rule began again. James VII, his brother, was overthrown in 1688–89 because of his Catholic faith; his daughters, Mary II and Anne, were the last Stuarts to rule in the British Isles, Anne dying in 1714. The Kingdom of Scotland, however, had already ceased to exist in 1707, when the Act of Union amalgamated the Kingdoms of England and Scotland into a united Kingdom of Great Britain. James VII's son, James Francis Edward Stuart, refusing to accept the Act of Union, claimed the English and Scottish thrones, as did his son Charles Edward Stuart; however, they are not considered legitimate Kings of Scotland, since they never effectively secured their claims, and so their wives are not listed here.

 For the subsequent consorts of Great Britain and the United Kingdom, see List of British consorts.

Stuart pretenders, 1689–1824
Despite the deposition of James II in 1689, he and his descendants continued to claim the thrones of England, Scotland, and Ireland for more than a century afterwards. This claim was, when politically suitable, recognised by some other European monarchs. As the Stuart pretenders considered the government of England after 1688 to be illegitimate, they did not recognise the validity of the union of the English and Scottish crowns in 1707, or the union with Ireland in 1801.

See also
List of Scottish monarchs
List of Scottish royal mistresses

consorts, List of Scottish
Consorts
Scottish consorts, List of
Scotland